Henry Austin (December 4, 1804 – December 17, 1891) was a prominent and prolific American architect based in New Haven, Connecticut. He practiced for more than fifty years and designed many public buildings and homes primarily in the New Haven area. His most significant years of production seem to be the 1840s and 1850s.

Life and practice
The paucity of precise information concerned with Austin and a lack of many personal papers (such as diaries or letters) makes a complete biography of his life difficult to write. Austin was born in Hamden, Connecticut in 1804 and was the son of Daniel and Adah (Dorman) Austin.  He first seems to have worked as a carpenter's apprentice and then began his career in architecture in association with Ithiel Town and Alexander Jackson Davis, although the nature of his relationship to Town and Davis has not been ascertained. In 1837, he opened his own office in Hartford, evidenced by newspaper advertisements. In Hartford, he designed the tower of Christ Church Cathedral (1838), the Wadsworth Athenaeum with Town and Davis (1842, his involvement is uncertain), the demolished gothic-revival Kellogg house (1841), and the long-gone 1842 building for St. John's Episcopal Church (Hartford, Connecticut); he also became associated at this time with Nelson Hotchkiss a New Haven real estate developer and designed with him villas along "Park Row" in Trenton, NJ, probably his first major commission.

In 1841, he moved his practice to New Haven where his first significant commission was the now-demolished, Greek Revival George Gabriel House (1841). In New Haven, Austin's style diversified; in one ad, Austin claimed he could design buildings "in every variety of architectural style".   He worked in a range of styles popular in the nineteenth century including Gothic, Italianate, Egyptian and Moorish Revival. In some buildings, he employed an eclectic mix of styles, creating varied, exotic formi. His New Haven work left a lasting impression on the domestic architecture of the then-developing real estate projects in the areas of Wooster Square and Hillhouse Avenue. In Wooster Square he designed the Italianate James E. English House (1845), the exotic Indian/Moorish Willis Bristol House (1845), the Nelson Hotchkiss House (1850), and the irregular Italianate villa Oliver B. King House (1852). On Hillhouse Avenue he worked on the James Dwight Dana House (1848) and the John Pitkin Norton House (1849), as well as remodeled the Greek Revival Ithiel Town House of 1836 for Joseph E. Sheffield in 1859 (demolished), encasing Town's structure in an exuberant Italianate shell. In New Haven, Austin made the so-called candelabra column (a column inspired by Indian architecture consisting of superimposed vegetal layers) his signature, as well as elaborate Indian/Moorish lambrequins over windows, and thick vegetal anthemia and tendrils over window surrounds. Other significant works in New Haven include the Grove Street Cemetery Gate in Egyptian Revival (1848–49), Dwight Hall at Yale (1842–1845), the Townsend City Savings Bank (demolished, 1852), the Palladium Building (formerly Young Men's Institute, 1855) and the strange Moorish New Haven Railroad Station (demolished, 1848). His most significant non-residential commission in New Haven was the City Hall (1860), a polychrome, asymmetrical, Gothic Revival structure, which, although significantly altered in the 1980s, still maintains Austin's facade and some interior decorative features.

Austin also worked in other regions and states. In Connecticut, he designed churches in Gothic revival and Italianate styles in Northford (Congregational 1845), Waterbury (St. John's Episcopal Church, 1846), Kent (First Congregational 1849), Plainville (Congregational 1850), and Seymour (Trinity Episcopal, 1858). Perhaps his most significant out-of-state commission was the Morse-Libby House (Victoria Mansion) in Portland, ME, 1857–1860, for Sylvester Ruggles Morse. This large, elaborate Italianate mansion in brownstone is considered one of Austin's best works and has been called "one of the culminating domestic designs of the antebellum years, and of the Italianate villa in general." One of his last major commissions was for the gothic, brownstone library (Rich Hall, 1866–68), now Patricelli '92 Theater, at Wesleyan University in Middletown, CT.

After the 1860s, Austin's style changed with the times, incorporating structures in the Second Empire and Stick styles. In 1868, he constructed two Second Empire houses on Prospect Street in New Haven for Oliver Winchester and John M. Davies. The Winchester House has been demolished, but the Davies house remains, having been restored by Yale and renamed the Betts House. Austin's son, Fred, joined his father's practice in later years, but the firm did not survive long after Austin's death. Throughout his later years, Austin maintained control of his firm and was famous as he aged for wearing a dark brown wig. He was the chairman of the Board of Commissioners of Public Buildings in New Haven at the time of his death; he also served on the New Haven city council in 1854 and belonged to the Masons for fifty years. For an image of the only photograph that was taken of Austin:   In recent years, curiosity has been raised about Austin's professional relationship to his New Haven contemporary, Sidney Mason Stone, but, other than minor references to civic duties they shared, there seems to be little documentation available to fuel such an inquiry.

Austin was married twice, first to Harriet M. Hooker, then to Jane Hempstead, and had four children who survived into adulthood, Willard, Henry, David, and Fred.  He died in 1891 in New Haven and is interred in Grove Street Cemetery, whose famous gates he designed.

Selected works
* indicates demolished or significantly altered buildings

References

External links
 Yale University Library Digital Collections. Henry Austin.
 Henry Austin papers (MS 1034). Manuscripts and Archives, Yale University Library. 

1804 births
1891 deaths
Architects from Connecticut
Architects from Hartford, Connecticut
Architects from New Haven, Connecticut
Burials at Grove Street Cemetery
19th-century American architects